Cychrus armeniacus is a species of ground beetle in the subfamily of Carabinae. It was described by Chaud in 1879.

References

armeniacus
Beetles described in 1879